The 2022–23 season will be Dumbarton Football Club's first in Scottish League Two, the fourth tier of Scottish football, having finished ninth in the division in 2021–22 season and been relegated via the playoffs. Dumbarton will also compete in the Scottish League Cup and the Scottish Cup.

Story of the season

May 

Following the Sons' relegation to Scottish League Two eight players were released by the club. Paul Paton headed the departures, with Sam Ramsbottom, Patrick O'Neil, Sam Muir, Stephen Bronsky, Eoghan Stokes, Mark Lamont and David Hopkirk also released. Loan players Carlo Pignatiello, Kieran Wright and Adam Hutchinson returned to their parent clubs, whilst George Stanger was offered a permanent deal after impressing during his loan spell from University of Stirling. Player of the Year Conner Duthie was also offered a new contract however he turned it down, whilst veteran Patrick Boyle was offered a player/coach role. Joshua Oyinsan was next to leave, as he was released by the club on 12 May. David Wilson became the club's first new signing of the summer on 14 May, joining four years after leaving the club. He was followed the same day by winger Ally Love who joined after leaving Clyde. A day later Brett Long joined the club from Peterhead, signing a two-year deal. However Paddy Boyle turned down the offer of a player/coach role and left the club. Striker Kristoffer Syvertsen also left the club a week later to return to his native Norway. Martin McNiff became the club's fourth new signing of the summer, re-joining the club after leaving in 2014. The club also announced their first pre-season friendly, against Workington, on Tuesday 5 July. Further friendlies against Ayr United, Caledonian Braves and Gretna 2008 were also arranged.

June 

In June a further friendly was arranged, with West of Scotland Football League Irvine Meadow XI. Defender George Stanger meanwhile turned down a permanent deal, having impressed during his loan from University of Stirling. Midfielder Ryan Blair became the club's fifth new signing of the summer on 4 June, and was joined the same day by former Albion Rovers captain Aron Lynas. A week later striker Ryan Wallace joined on a two-year deal from East Fife. On 14 April the club added sports scientist Matty Fenwick and video analyst Stephen Gray to their backroom staff. The club's squad numbers were confirmed on 15 June. On 22 June, striker Declan Byrne became the club's eighth new signing of the summer, joining after leaving Albion Rovers. Dumbarton's first pre-season friendly ended in a 1-1 draw with Ayr United at National Sports Training Centre Inverclyde, Ally Love scored the Sons' goal. Two days later came a 1-0 defeat to Lowland Football League Caledonian Braves. Ryan McGeever was named the club's new captain on 27 June, replacing Stuart Carswell in the role. Gregor Buchanan was named as vice-captain.

July 
On 1 July goalkeeper Harry Broun joined the club from Kilmarnock having impressed as a trialist. The following day the Sons won 3-2 against Gretna F.C. 2008 thanks to goals from Ryan Wallace, Gregor Buchanan and a trialist striker. Wallace was on the scoresheet again three days later in a 3-0 victory against Northern Premier League outfit Workington. Midfielder Finlay Gray was next to join the club, having impressed as a trialist. He signed the same day as the club lost their opening Scottish League Cup clash 2-1 against Stirling Albion. The club's next game also ended in defeat, 2-0 to Premiership Aberdeen on 13 July. The Sons recorded their first win of the season on 16 July - 2-0 against 10 man Peterhead. Finlay Gray opened the scoring with Gregor Buchanan netting in the second-half. The League Cup campaign ended with a 0-0 draw with Scottish Championship Raith Rovers - with Sons losing the bonus point penalty shootout 3-2. 23 July saw the club defeat Irvine Meadow XI in their final pre-season friendly - with Declan Byrne, Ally Love and Finlay Gray all netting. The league season opened with a 2-0 victory against Stirling Albion thanks to Declan Byrne's double inside the first five minutes.

August 
The Sons won their opening two games in August, making it their best start to a season since 1959. First was a 2-1 victory against 10 man Albion Rovers with Stuart Carswell and Ryan Wallace on target. That was followed by a 4-0 success against Annan Athletic on 13 August - with Declan Byrne's second double in as many home games added to by strikes from Gregor Buchanan and Finlay Gray. Forward John Gemmell also featured as a trialist - having left the club back in 2007 - setting up the fourth goal. He signed a permanent deal with the club on 19 August and said he was in the best shape of his career. The following day the Sons made it four wins from four, with a Thomas Orr own goal added to by Martin McNiff and Finlay Gray in a 3-1 win against Stenhousemuir. After a 7-0 defeat to Rangers B Team in the Scottish Challenge Cup, Ally Love's double ensured the Sons won their first five league games for the first time in the club's history - with a 2-1 success against Elgin City. A few days later attacking midfielder Callum Wilson joined Lowland League Broomhill on loan. Finlay Gray was named the club's August player of the month.

September 
September opened with the Sons adding attacking midfielder Michael Garrity on loan from Morton. The club's first game of the month ended in a 1-0 victory against East Fife - with Declan Byrne on target. On 7 September, boss Stevie Farrell was named League Two manager of the month for August whilst Byrne was named League Two player of the month. Following the postponement of an away clash with Stranraer on 10 September following the death of Elizabeth II, another 1-0 victory followed, with Stuart Carswell's penalty the winner against Bonnyrigg Rose Athletic on 17 Septemberleaving the Sons as the only team with a 100 percent record in British league football. Dumbarton suffered their first league defeat of the season on 202 September, losing 3-2 to Stranraer at Stair Park. In the Scottish Cup the Sons were drawn against West of Scotland Football League Cumnock Juniors, with the match selected for live coverage on BBC Scotland. Stuart Carswell was named as the club's player of the month for September.

October 
The first match of October saw Dumbarton held to a 0-0 draw by Forfar Athletic at Station Park. On 7 October midfielder Finlay Gray, who had been named the club's Player of the Month for August, signed an extended deal until the summer of 2024. A 6-0 defeat to Stirling Albion followed on 8 October, with the Sons dropping behind the Binos to second in the table the following week after a 1-1 draw with Albion Rovers. Stuart Carswell got Sons' goal from the penalty spot with John Gemmell suffering a serious Achilles injury. Dumbarton avoided a Scottish Cup upset, winning 3-1 against West of Scotland Football League side Cumnock Juniors. Another Stuart Carswell penalty was added to by Gregor Buchanan and Finlay Gray in a 3-1 success. The month ended with a 1-0 away victory against Annan Athletic courtesy of Gregg Wylde's first goal of the season, whilst Kalvin Orsi was named the club's October Player of the Month.

November 
The Sons made it three wins in a row on 5 November, defeating Stranraer 2-0 at the Rock with Gregor Buchanan and Michael Garrity on target. A fourth win in succession followed, with Sons defeating Elgin City 4-0 at Borough Briggs. Ross MacLean, Gregg Wylde, Aron Lynas and Ryan Wallace got the Sons' goals. The winning run ended on 19 November, as the Sons were held 2-2 by 10 man Forfar Athletic. Gregg Wylde scored his third goal in four games, with David Wilson scoring his first of the season. Former Sons player Kyle Hutton was sent-off for the Loons, with another former Dumbarton player - Stefan McCluskey - on target. The month ended with the club securing their place in the fourth round of the 2022–23 Scottish Cup thanks to a 3-1 victory against League One Clyde. David Wilson, Ryan Wallace and Ross MacLean got the goals. They were drawn against Scottish Premiership side Kilmarnock in the fourth round. Defender Aron Lynas was named the club's player of the month.

December 
December opened with a 1-1 draw against Bonnyrigg Rose Athletic, with Edin Lynch making his first appearance for the club since April. On 6 December, boss Stephen Farrell was named League Two Manager of the Month for the second time. After 17 December's game with Stenhousemuir was postponed, the Sons returned to action on Christmas Eve. Defeat East Fife 2-0 - on the day the club celebrated their 150th anniversary. On 30 December midfielder Michael Garrity returned to parent club Morton, after making one start and nine appearances from the bench. 2022 ended with a 1-0 victory against Albion Rovers on Hogmanay. Ally Love scoring the winner. Brett Long was named the club's player of the month.

January 
The Sons' first game of 2023, against second place- side Stirling Albion was called off on 7 January due to a waterlogged pitch. On 13 January, young midfielder Luca Vata was promoted from the club's U18s to the first-team squad on amateur terms. The following day striker Russell McLean joined from Scottish League One side Peterhead, having scored four times against the Sons in the previous campaign. McLean made his debut that afternoon, in a 2-1 defeat to Forfar Athletic - with Sons reduced to 10 men after just 12 minutes when Ryan McGeever was sent-off. On 19 January boss Stephen Farrell and his backroom team signed a new deal until the summer of 2025. The club exited the Scottish Cup on 21 January, with an injury time loss to Premiership Kilmarnock. On 28 January the club secured a first win of the new year, 1-0 against Bonnyrigg Rose Athletic thanks to a Gregg Wylde strike. On 30 January midfielder Callum Wilson, who had been on loan at Broomhill, left the club permanently. Gregg Wylde was named the club's player of the month.

February 
On 1 February club captain Ryan McGeever joined Scottish League One Clyde on loan, with Peter Grant moving in the opposite direction. Grant made his debut in a 1-1 draw with Stenhousemuir on February 4, with Matty Yates scoring in injury time to cancel out Ally Love's opener. A second straight home win followed on February 11, with Russell McLean netting his first goal for the club in a 2-1 success against Annan Athletic. That was followed by a 2-0 defeat to East Fife on February 18, which saw Stirling Albion narrow the gap to Sons to just three points. The club suffered back-to-back league defeats for the first time when Elgin City won at the Rock on February 25. Becoming the first away side to win a league game at the ground for 11 months. Three days later Dumbarton returned to winning ways, defeating Stenhousemuir 1-0 at home thanks to Finlay Gray's first-half goal. Aron Lynas was named as the club's player of the month.

March 
March began with a 2-0 away victory against Stranraer, thanks to goals from Ross MacLean and Gregor Buchanan. 16-year-old academy graduate Luca Vata, nephew of former Celtic player Rudi Vata, made his debut as a late substitute. On March 7 a planned game with second placed Stirling Albion was called off due to a frozen pitch with under two hours notice, leading to the Binos submitting a complaint to the Scottish Professional Football League. Four days later a planned clash with Forfar Athletic also fell victim to the weather. The Sons returned to action on March 18, suffering a humiliating 5-1 defeat to ninth placed Albion Rovers.

First team transfers 
 From end of 2021–22 season, to last match of season 2022–23

In

Out

Fixtures and results

Friendlies

Scottish League One

Scottish Cup

Scottish Challenge Cup

Scottish League Cup

Matches

Player statistics 

As of 18 March 2023 (UTC)

All competitions

Captains 

Club captain
Vice-captain
Third-captain

League table

References 

Dumbarton
Dumbarton